Rancho Atascadero was a  Mexican land grant in present-day San Luis Obispo County, California.

It was granted in 1842 by Governor Juan Alvarado to Trifon Garcia.  The grant extended along the Salinas River and encompassed present-day Atascadero.

History
The one square league grant was from the secularized holdings of Mission San Miguel Arcángel.  Trifon Garcia was a son of Ynocente Garcia, who was administrator at Mission San Miguel.

With the cession of California to the United States following the Mexican-American War, the 1848 Treaty of Guadalupe Hidalgo provided that the land grants would be honored.  As required by the Land Act of 1851, a claim for Rancho Atascadero was filed with the Public Land Commission in 1852, and the grant was patented  to Henry Haight in 1860.

The rancho was sold in 1864 to Martin Murphy Jr. (1807–1884) and his wife Mary Bulger Murphy (d.1892) of Sunnyvale, who had come to California with the Stephens-Townsend-Murphy Party in 1844.   The Murphys turned over running of the rancho to their son Patrick Murphy, who was a General in the California National Guard.

In 1912, Edward Gardner Lewis, a successful magazine publisher, bought Rancho Atascadero from J.H. Henry.  Lewis founded the utopian, planned community of Atascadero in 1913.

See also

List of Ranchos of California

References

Atascadero
Atascadero, California
Santa Lucia Range
Atascadero
Atascadero